The National Industrial Property Institute (INPI, standing for Institut national de la propriété industrielle in French) is the national intellectual property office of France, in charge of patents, trademarks and industrial design rights. It is a department of France's Ministry of Economics and Finance. INPI's headquarters is in Courbevoie, France.

See also
 Soleau envelope, proof of priority available for the French territory at the INPI

Directors
 Georges Vianès (1975–1982)
 Benoît Battistelli (?–2010)
 Yves Lapierre (2010–2016)
 Romain Soubeyran (2016-2018)
 Pascal Faure

References

External links
  
 Patent status database at the Institut national de la propriété industrielle (the database provides legal information on French patent applications and European patent applications granted and designating France)

Government agencies of France
French intellectual property law
Patent offices